The SAFF Women's Friendly Tournament is an invitational women's football tournament held early in the year in Saudi Arabia. In the first edition (in 2023), it was contested by Comoros, Mauritius, Pakistan and hosts Saudi Arabia.

Results

Participating nations

See also
Saudi Arabian Football Federation (SAFF)
Football in Saudi Arabia
Women's football in Saudi Arabia

References

External links
Official website 
Official website 

International women's association football invitational tournaments
Recurring sporting events established in 2023

January sporting events